The , or the Great Rite of Āṭavaka, is one of the  of Esoteric Shingon Buddhism. Its name is also sometimes pronounced Daigen no hō. The ritual is performed with Āṭavaka in the role of honzon, and it may be considered a military curse.

Early history

In the year 839, the monk Jōgyō, a disciple of Kūkai, introduced the Imperial Court to the procedures of the Daigensuihō as part of the systematic importation of Tang esoteric practices. A decade later in 851, the Daijō-kan issued a document ordering the annual implementation of the Daigensuihō. As a result, it is believed to have been formally established in that year.

Since then, the ritual was performed every year between the 8th to the 17th days after the New Year at the facilities of the Ministry of the Imperial Household. The necessary equipment was to be procured from Akishino-dera in Yamato Province, which was associated with Jōgyō.

Vassals (i.e. the court aristocracy) were not allowed to perform it on their own initiative.

It is known that Oda Nobunaga, who at the time held the reins of government, cooperated with Emperor Ōgimachi in the restoration of the image of Āṭavaka in 1575. In the Edo period, the Daigensuihō was once again revived at the Imperial palace in Kyoto. It was held there until the Meiji Restoration.

Modern military use

In 1904,  of Yokohama produced a standing image of Āṭavaka which was used in a Daigensuihō performed in prayer for victory in the Russo-Japanese War.

 points out the connection between the title , which was used by the Emperor as the commander-in-chief of the Japanese armed forces, and the name of the Daigensuihō, which contains the same characters and was meant to be carried out solely in the Emperor's presence.

References 

Shingon Buddhism
Vajrayana practices
Japanese Imperial Rituals
Russo-Japanese War
Military of the Empire of Japan
Military history of Japan
Military history of Japan during World War II